A statue of sportscaster Bob Miller by artists Julie Rotblatt Amrany and Omri Amrany is installed outside Los Angeles' Crypto.com Arena, in the U.S. state of California. He was the Los Angeles Kings' longtime broadcaster from 1973 to 2017. The sculpture was unveiled in 2018.

References 

2018 establishments in California
2018 sculptures
Monuments and memorials in Los Angeles
Outdoor sculptures in Greater Los Angeles
Sculptures of men in California
South Park (Downtown Los Angeles)
Statues in Los Angeles